Myopites cypriacus is a species of tephritid or fruit flies in the genus Myopites of the family Tephritidae.

Distribution
Italy, Cyprus, Israel.

References

Tephritinae
Insects described in 1938
Diptera of Europe